Minerva Medica is a bimonthly peer-reviewed medical journal published in English and Italian. It was established in 1909 and is published by Edizioni Minerva Medica. The editor-in-chief is M. L. Benzo. In 1970 it absorbed Minerva Medica Siciliana.

Abstracting and indexing
The journal is abstracted and indexed in:

According to the Journal Citation Reports, the journal has a 2013 impact factor of 1.202, ranking it 83rd out of 156 journals in the category "Medicine, General & Internal".

History
The journal was established in 1909, but publication was suspended for 1920. From 1921 to 1929 volumes were numbered as a new series from 1 to 9 but constitute, in fact, volumes 12 to 20. In 1970 Minerva Medica absorbed Minerva Medica Siciliana, previously titled Gazzetta Medica Siciliana, which was established in 1869. The absorbed publication continues as a supplement with its own numbering.

References

External links

Internal medicine journals
Multilingual journals
Bimonthly journals
Publications established in 1909